= Ma Kwok Po =

Hong Kong windsurfer

Ma Kwok Po (Chinese: 馬國寶; Jyutping: maa^{5} gwok^{3} bou^{2}), also known as Panda ma, is a former Hong Kong national windsurfer.

== Awards ==
- 2003 Mistral Youth & Junior World Championships—Mistral Junior Boys - Bronze Medal
- 2006 Mistral Youth & Junior World Championships—Mistral Youth Boys - Gold Medal
- 2006 FedEx RS:X Asian Championships—RS:X Men - Bronze Medal
